Rob Graafland (26 November 1875 – 28 April 1940) was a Dutch painter. His work was part of the painting event in the art competition at the 1936 Summer Olympics.

References

1875 births
1940 deaths
20th-century Dutch painters
Dutch male painters
Olympic competitors in art competitions
Artists from Maastricht
20th-century Dutch male artists